Taxeotis exsectaria is a species of moth of the  family Geometridae. It is found in Australia.

Oenochrominae
Moths of Australia
Moths described in 1861